Brothers Air Services, internationally known as BASCO was established in 1967 by Sayid Zein A. Baharoon following the end of British colonialism in Aden. It operated in the People's Democratic Republic of Yemen (PDRY) from 1967 to 1971 before its assets were nationalized and incorporated into the newly created Alyemda Airline.

According to Erich Wiedemann, BASCO flew to Addis Ababa in neighboring Ethiopia, as well as to Assab.

According to Olivier Roy (political scientist), BASCO operated weekly flights between Aden and Brussels.

Fleet details
The BASCO company owned two DC3 aircraft; VR-ABE, Construction No:16583/33331 and VR-ABF Construction No:13475.

References

Airlines established in 1967
Airlines disestablished in 1971
Airlines of South Yemen
Defunct airlines of Yemen
South Yemeni companies established in 1971